This is a list of Princeton University alumni who competed in the Olympic Games. In this list, the term athletics refers to track and field.

Summer Olympians
Robert Garrett, class of 1897, men's athletics, 1896 Athens Olympics, 1900 Paris Olympics
Herbert Jamison, class of 1897, men's athletics, 1896 Athens Olympics
Francis Lane, class of 1897, men's athletics, 1896 Athens Olympics
Albert Tyler, class of 1897, men's athletics, 1896 Athens Olympics
John Cregan, class of 1900, men's athletics, 1900 Paris Olympics
Frank Jarvis, class of 1900, men's athletics, 1900 Paris Olympics
John DeWitt, class of 1904, men's athletics, 1904 St. Louis Olympics
John Eisele, class of 1906, men's athletics, 1908 London Olympics
Rupert Thomas, class of 1913, men's athletics, 1912 Stockholm Olympics
Henry Breckenridge, class of 1907, men's fencing, 1920 Antwerp Olympics, 1928 Amsterdam Olympics
Karl Frederick, class of 1903, men's shooting, 1920 Antwerp Olympics
Ralph Hills, class of 1925, men's athletics, 1924 Paris Olympics
Leon Schoonmaker, class of 1904, men's fencing, 1920 Antwerp Olympics
William Stevenson, class of 1922, men's athletics, 1924 Paris Olympics
John Coard Taylor, class of 1923, men's athletics, 1924 Paris Olympics 
Benjamin Hedges, class of 1930, men's athletics, 1928 Amsterdam Olympics
Horace Disston, class of 1928, men's field hockey, 1932 Los Angeles Olympics, 1936 Berlin Olympics
Samuel Ewing, class of 1927, men's field hockey, 1932 Los Angeles Olympics, 1936 Berlin Olympics
Warren Ingersoll, class of 1931, men's field hockey, 1932 Los Angeles Olympics
Tracy Jaeckel, class of 1928, men's fencing, 1932 Los Angeles Olympics, 1936 Berlin Olympics
David McMullin, class of 1930, men's field hockey, 1932 Los Angeles Olympics, 1936 Berlin Olympics
Edwin Moles, class of 1931, men's swimming, 1932 Los Angeles Olympics
Paul Fentress, class of 1936, men's field hockey, 1936 Berlin Olympics
Ellwood Godfrey, class of 1933, men's field hockey, 1936 Berlin Olympics
Al Vande Weghe, class of 1940, men's swimming, 1936 Berlin Olympics
Herman Whiton, class of 1926, men's sailing, 1948 London Olympics, 1952 Helsinki Olympics
Gerrit Schoonmaker, class of 1953, men's sailing, 1952 Helsinki Olympics, 1964 Tokyo Olympics
Kinmont Hoitsma, class of 1956, men's fencing, 1956 Melbourne Olympics
Robert Stinson, class of 1955, men's sailing, 1956 Melbourne Olympics
John Allis, class of 1965, men's cycling, 1964 Tokyo Olympics, 1968 Mexico City Olympics, 1972 Munich Olympics
Frank Anger, class of 1961, men's fencing, 1964 Tokyo Olympics
Bill Bradley, class of 1965, men's basketball, 1964 Tokyo Olympics
Seymour Cromwell, class 1956, men's rowing, 1964 Tokyo Olympics
Jed Graef, class of 1964, men's swimming, 1964 Tokyo Olympics
F. Gardner Cox, class of 1941, men's sailing, 1968 Mexico City Olympics
Doug Foy, class of 1969, men's rowing, 1968 Mexico City Olympics
Pete Raymond, class of 1968, men's rowing, 1968 Mexico City Olympics, 1972 Munich Olympics
Carl Van Duyne, class of 1968, men's sailing, 1968 Mexico City Olympics
Ross Wales, class of 1969, men's swimming, 1968 Mexico City Olympics
Thorsteinn Thorsteinsson Gislason, class of 1969, men's track and field, 1972 Munich Olympics
Gary Wright, class of 1970, men's rowing, 1968 Mexico City Olympics
Carol Brown, class of 1975, women's rowing, 1976 Montreal Olympics, 1984 Los Angeles Olympics 
Mimi Kellogg, class of 1976, women's rowing, 1976 Montreal Olympics
Harold Backer, class of 1985, men's rowing, 1984 Los Angeles Olympics, 1988 Seoul Olympics, 1992 Barcelona Olympics 
Tina Clark, class of 1976, women's rowing, 1984 Los Angeles Olympics 
J. Michael Evans, class of 1980, men's rowing, 1984 Los Angeles Olympics 
Ridgely Johnson, class of 1980, men's rowing, 1984 Los Angeles Olympics 
Anne Marden, class of 1981, women's rowing, 1984 Los Angeles Olympics, 1988 Seoul Olympics, 1992 Barcelona Olympics 	 
Chris Penny, class of 1985, men's rowing, 1984 Los Angeles Olympics 
Lee Shelley, class of 1978, men's fencing, 1984 Los Angeles Olympics, 1988 Seoul Olympics  
August Wolf, class of 1983, men's athletics, 1984 Los Angeles Olympics 
Doug Burden, class of 1988, men's rowing, 1988 Seoul Olympics, 1992 Barcelona Olympics, 1996 Atlanta Olympics 	
Lynn Jennings, class of 1983, women's athletics, 1988 Seoul Olympics, 1992 Barcelona Olympics, 1996 Atlanta Olympics 	
Katy McCandless, class of 1992, women's athletics, 1996 Atlanta Olympics
Deborah St. Phard, class of 1987, women's athletics, 1988 Seoul Olympics  
Dan Veatch, class of 1987, men's swimming, 1988 Seoul Olympics 
Nelson Diebel, class of 1996, men's swimming, 1992 Barcelona Olympics 	 
Dan Nowosielski, class of 1991, men's fencing, 1992 Barcelona Olympics, 1996 Atlanta Olympics 	 	
John Parker, class of 1989, men's rowing, 1992 Barcelona Olympics 	
Nathalie Wunderlich, class of 1993, women's swimming, 1992 Barcelona Olympics
Lianne Bennion Nelson, class of 1995, women's rowing, 1996 Atlanta Olympics, 2000 Sydney Olympics, 2004 Athens Olympics
Kevin Cotter, class of 1996, men's rowing, 1996 Atlanta Olympics, 2000 Sydney Olympics 
Chris Ahrens, class of 1998, men's rowing, 2000 Sydney Olympics, 2004 Athens Olympics
Derek Bouchard-Hall, class of 1992, men's cycling, 2000 Sydney Olympics
Morgan Crooks, class of 1998, men's rowing, 2000 Sydney Olympics
Thomas Herschmiller, class of 2001, men's rowing, 2000 Sydney Olympics, 2004 Athens Olympics
Sean Kammann, class of 1998, men's rowing, 2000 Sydney Olympics 
Paul Teti, class of 2001, men's rowing, 2000 Sydney Olympics, 2004 Athens Olympics, 2008 Beijing Olympics 	
Juan Pablo Valdivieso, class of 2004, men's swimming, 2000 Sydney Olympics, 2004 Athens Olympics
Tom Welsh, class of 1999, men's rowing, 2000 Sydney Olympics
Soren Thompson, class of 2005, men's fencing, 2004 Athens Olympics, 2012 London Olympics 	
Kamara James, class of 2008, women's fencing, 2004 Athens Olympics
Danika Holbrook, class of 1995, women's rowing, 2004 Athens Olympics 	
Andréanne Morin, class of 2006, women's rowing, 2004 Athens Olympics, 2008 Beijing Olympics, 2012 London Olympics 
Tanya Kalyvas, class of 2001, women's soccer, 2004 Athens Olympics
Tora Harris, class of 2002, men's athletics, 2004 Athens Olympics
Steven Coppola, class of 2006, men's rowing, 2008 Beijing Olympics
Sandra Fong, class of 2013, women's shooting, 2008 Beijing Olympics
Doug Lennox, class of 2009, men's swimming, 2008 Beijing Olympics
Caroline Lind, class of 2006, women's rowing, 2008 Beijing Olympics, 2012 London Olympics
Sam Loch, class of 2006, men's rowing, 2008 Beijing Olympics, 2012 London Olympics
Diana Matheson, class of 2008, women's soccer, 2008 Beijing Olympics, 2012 London Olympics, 2016 Rio Olympics
Meredith Michaels-Beerbaum, class of 1992, women's equestrian, 2008 Beijing Olympics, 2012 London Olympics, 2016 Rio Olympics 
Lia Pernell, class of 2003, women's rowing, 2008 Beijing Olympics
Bryan Tay, class of 2012, men's swimming, 2008 Beijing Olympics
Konrad Wysocki, class of 2004, men's basketball, 2008 Beijing Olympics
Donn Cabral, class of 2012, men's athletics, 2012 London Olympics, 2016 Rio Olympics
Sara Hendershot, class of 2010, women's rowing, 2012 London Olympics
Ariel Hsing, class of 2017, women's table tennis, 2012 London Olympics
Maya Lawrence, class of 2002, women's fencing, 2012 London Olympics
Glenn Ochal, class of 2008, men's rowing, 2012 London Olympics, 2016 Rio Olympics
Robin Prendes, class of 2011, men's rowing, 2012 London Olympics, 2016 Rio Olympics
Julia Reinprecht, class of 2014, women's field hockey, 2012 London Olympics, 2016 Rio Olympics
Katie Reinprecht, class of 2013, women's field hockey, 2012 London Olympics, 2016 Rio Olympics
Kathleen Sharkey, class of 2013, women's field hockey, 2016 Rio Olympics
Susie Scanlan, class of 2014, women's fencing, 2012 London Olympics
Genevra Stone, class of 2007, women's rowing, 2012 London Olympics, 2016 Rio Olympics
Lauren Wilkinson, class of 2011, women's rowing, 2012 London Olympics, 2016 Rio Olympics
Erica Wu, class of 2018, women's table tennis, 2012 London Olympics
Ashleigh Johnson, class of 2017, women's water polo, 2016 Rio Olympics
Kate Bertko, class of 2006, women’s rowing, 2016 Rio Olympics
Mohamed Hamza, class of 2023, men's fencing, 2016 Rio Olympics, 2020 Tokyo Olympics

Winter Olympians
Robert Livingston, class of 1931, men's ice hockey, 1932 Lake Placid Olympics
Fred Kammer, class of 1934, men's ice hockey, 1936 Garmisch-Partenkirchen Olympics
Malcolm McAlpin, class of 1932, men's ice hockey, 1936 Garmisch-Partenkirchen Olympics
Christopher R.P. Rodgers, class of 1942, men's ice hockey 1948 St. Moritz Olympics
James Sloane, class of 1943, men's ice hockey 1948 St. Moritz Olympics 
Andrea Kilbourne, class of 2002, women's ice hockey, 2002 Salt Lake City Olympics
Nikola Holmes, class of 2003, women's ice hockey, 2006 Turin Olympics
Joey Cheek, class of 2011, men's speed skating, 2002 Salt Lake City Olympics, 2006 Turin Olympics
Declan Farmer, class of 2020, para ice hockey, 2014 Sochi Paralympics, 2018 PyeongChang Paralympics

References

External links 

Olympians
Princeton
Princeton
Princeton University Olympians